Three ships of the Imperial German Navy have been named SMS Prinz Adalbert:
, an ironclad ram originally ordered for the Confederate States Navy
, a corvette that served in the German overseas colonial empire
, an armored cruiser sunk by a British submarine in World War I

See also
 Prinz Adalbert-class cruiser
 

German Navy ship names